The Waipoua River is a river of the Wellington Region of New Zealand's North Island. It flows south from the eastern flanks of the Tararua Range, passing through the city of Masterton before reaching the Ruamahanga River on the city's southeastern outskirts.

See also
List of rivers of New Zealand

References

Rivers of the Wellington Region
Rivers of New Zealand